Harlan County may refer to:

Places in the United States
 Harlan County, Kentucky
 Harlan County, Nebraska

Other
 Harlan County (album), a 1969 album by American singer-songwriter Jim Ford
 Harlan County, USA, a 1976 American documentary film
 USS Harlan County (LST-1196), a U.S. Navy tank landing ship

See also